Romario Antonio Piggott Rivera (born 17 July 1995) is a Panamanian footballer who plays as a midfielder. He is the son of former professional footballer and Panama national football team player Pércival Piggott.

Career 
On September 7, 2018, Piggot signed with Charleston Battery. Following the 2022 season, Piggott was released by Charleston.

References

External links

1995 births
Living people
Chepo FC players
Tauro F.C. players
Coastal Carolina Chanticleers men's soccer players
Myrtle Beach Mutiny players
Charleston Battery players
Liga Panameña de Fútbol players
USL Championship players
Panamanian footballers
Association football forwards
USL League Two players
Junior college men's soccer players in the United States
Sportspeople from Panama City
Panama under-20 international footballers